Qeshlaq-e Aq Borun (also Romanized as Qeshlāq-e Āq Borūn) is a village in Gowg Tappeh Rural District, in the Central District of Bileh Savar County, Ardabil Province, Iran. At the 2006 census, its population was 20, in 5 families.

References 

Towns and villages in Bileh Savar County